Jedidiah Gabriel "Jed" Collins (born March 3, 1986) is a former American football fullback. He was signed by the Philadelphia Eagles as an undrafted free agent in 2008. After playing college football at Washington State, he played three seasons for the New Orleans Saints, and he has also been a member of the Chicago Bears, Kansas City Chiefs, Arizona Cardinals, Cleveland Browns and Tennessee Titans.

Early life
Collins was a two-sport letterman (football and basketball) at Mission Viejo High School in Mission Viejo, California. One of his teammates on both the football and basketball teams was future NFL quarterback Mark Sanchez.  He was recruited to Washington State as a linebacker but played primarily at tight end, setting a school record in 2007 for most catches by a tight end.

Professional career
Collins was signed by the Philadelphia Eagles as an undrafted free agent following the 2008 NFL Draft. He was waived during final cuts, but was re-signed to the team's practice squad on September 3, 2008. He was released from the practice squad on October 21. Collins was signed to the Chicago Bears' practice squad on October 28, 2008, but was released on November 24. He was signed by the Cleveland Browns on November 26, 2008, and was a member of the active roster for two games before he was waived and re-signed to the team's practice squad on December 11. He was not re-signed by the Browns following the 2008 season.

Collins was signed to a two-year contract by the Kansas City Chiefs on January 8, 2009, but was waived during final cuts on September 4. He was signed to the Arizona Cardinals' practice squad on November 4, but was released on November 24. He was re-signed to the Browns' practice squad on December 2, and was re-signed after the conclusion of the 2009 season on January 7, 2010. He was waived by the Browns prior to the start of training camp on June 15. He would sign with the Tennessee Titans on August 6, 2010, but was waived during final cuts on September 4.

Collins signed with the New Orleans Saints' practice squad on September 23, 2010. The Saints at the time, were the defending Super Bowl champions.  After spending the entire 2010 season on their practice squad, starting fullback Heath Evans retired, and Collins became the Saints' starter. In his first season as a starter, the Saints' yards-per-carry average went from 22nd in the NFL in 2010 to fourth in the league in 2011, and Collins would be rated by as the second best fullback that season. He also served as the Saints' backup long snapper behind Justin Drescher.

On March 19, 2014 Collins signed a one-year deal with the Detroit Lions, where his offensive coordinator was former Saints coach Joe Lombardi.

On March 12, 2015, Collins signed a one-year contract with the Dallas Cowboys. Collins was cut on May 18 so the Cowboys could re-acquire fullback Tyler Clutts.

References

External links

Detroit Lions bio
New Orleans Saints bio
Tennessee Titans bio
Washington State Cougars bio

1986 births
Living people
Players of American football from California
Sportspeople from San Juan Capistrano, California
American football tight ends
American football fullbacks
Washington State Cougars football players
Philadelphia Eagles players
Chicago Bears players
Cleveland Browns players
Kansas City Chiefs players
Arizona Cardinals players
Tennessee Titans players
New Orleans Saints players
Detroit Lions players
Dallas Cowboys players
Mission Viejo High School alumni